The Burmese stone loach (Balitora burmanica) is a species of ray-finned fish in the genus Balitora. It occurs in the Irrawaddy, Salween, and Tenasserim basins in Burma, China, and Thailand. Its maximum length is  TL.

References

burmanica
Fish of Myanmar
Freshwater fish of China
Fish of Thailand
Fish described in 1932